The South African Railways Class 6E1, Series 4 of 1973 was an electric locomotive.

In 1973 and 1974, the South African Railways placed one hundred Class 6E1,  electric locomotives with a Bo-Bo wheel arrangement in mainline service. One of them holds the narrow gauge world rail speed record on Cape gauge.

Manufacturer

The 3 kV DC Class 6E1, Series 4 electric locomotive was designed and built for the South African Railways (SAR) by Union Carriage & Wagon (UCW) in Nigel, Transvaal, with the electrical equipment being supplied by the General Electric Company (GEC).

One hundred units were delivered in 1973 and 1974, numbered in the range from E1446 to E1545. Like Series 1 to 3, Series 4 units were equipped with four AEI-283AZ axle-hung traction motors. UCW did not allocate builder's or works numbers to the locomotives it built for the SAR and used the SAR unit numbers for their record keeping.

Characteristics

Orientation
These dual cab locomotives had a roof access ladder on one side only, just to the right of the cab access door. The roof access ladder end was marked as the no. 2 end. A corridor along the centre of the unit connected the cabs which were identical apart from the fact that the handbrake was located in cab 2. A pantograph hook stick was stowed in a tube mounted below the bottom edge of the locomotive body on the roof access ladder side. The units had one square and two rectangular access panels along the lower half of the body on the roof access ladder side, and only one square access panel on the opposite side.

Series identifying features

The Class 6E1 was produced in eleven series over a period of nearly sixteen years. While some Class 6E1 series were visually indistinguishable from their predecessors or successors, some externally visible changes did occur over the years.

The Series 3 to Series 5 locomotives are visually indistinguishable from each other. On the early Series 3 units in the number range from E1296 to E1345, an externally visible difference was a narrower stirrup below their side doors.

Service
The Class 6E1 family saw service all over both 3 kV DC mainline and branch line networks, the smaller Cape Western mainline between Cape Town and Beaufort West and the larger network which covers portions of the Northern Cape, the Free State, Natal, Gauteng, North West and Mpumalanga.

World rail speed record
During the 1970s, Dr. Herbert Scheffel of the SAR experimented with self-steering bogies which not only reduced flange wear on goods wagons, but also opened up the possibility of running at high speed in passenger service on Cape gauge.

In 1978, one of the Series 4 units, no. E1525, was modified for experiments in high speed traction by re-gearing the traction motors, installing SAR-designed Scheffel bogies and fitting a streamlined nose cone on the no. 1 end. In this configuration, no.

During November 1980, the same locomotive was used to test the British Rail-Brecknell Willis single-arm high speed pantograph, then still under development, as part of the SAR's research towards introducing a new high speed MetroBlitz service between Pretoria and Johannesburg. A number of European pantographs were being evaluated for use on the Class 6E1, with the trains running at  under catenary which usually saw nothing above . Testing took place over a  stretch of straight track between Rosslyn and De Wildt on the line between Pretoria and Brits.

In the 2000s, similar single-arm type pantographs were adopted by Spoornet. These pantographs gradually replaced the older box-frame type pantographs on all electric locomotive types as and when replacement became necessary. Along with Class Experimental AC no. E1600, no. E1525 is still dedicated to testing projects since its different gear ratio and traction effort curves make it unsuitable for use in multi-unit working with other Class 6E1 locomotives in the fleet.

The MetroBlitz service commenced in January 1984. This testing project eventually bore more fruit in 2011 upon the opening of the 1,435 millimetres broad gauge Gautrain which connects Pretoria, Johannesburg and the O.R. Tambo International Airport (the former Jan Smuts Airport) in Kempton Park.

No. E1525 is set to be preserved for the national collection by the SA Heritage Agency and Transnet Heritage Foundation.(stored Koedoespoort 03/2020)

Reclassification and rebuilding

Reclassification to Class 16E
During 1990 and 1991, Spoornet semi-permanently coupled several pairs of otherwise largely unmodified Class 6E1 units, reclassified them to Class 16E and allocated a single locomotive number to each pair, with the individual units in the pairs inscribed "A" or "B". The aim was to accomplish savings on cab maintenance by coupling the units at their no. 1 ends, abandoning the no. 1 end cabs in terms of maintenance and using only the no. 2 end cabs.

One known Series 4 unit, no. E1457, was part of such a Class 16E pair and became Class 16E no. 16-305B.

Rebuilding to Class 18E

Beginning in 2000, Spoornet began a project to rebuild Series 2 to 11 Class 6E1 units to Class 18E, Series 1 and Series 2 at the Transnet Rail Engineering workshops at Koedoespoort. In the process the cab at the no. 1 end was stripped of all controls and the driver's front and side windows were blanked off to have a toilet installed, thereby forfeiting the unit's bi-directional ability.

Since the driving cab's noise level had to be below 85 decibels, cab 2 was selected as the Class 18E driving cab, primarily based on its lower noise level compared to cab 1 which was closer and more exposed to the compressor's noise and vibration. Another factor was the closer proximity of cab 2 to the low voltage switch panel. The fact that the handbrake was located in cab 2 was not a deciding factor, but was considered an additional benefit.

The known Class 6E1, Series 4 units which were used in this project were all rebuilt to Class 18E, Series 2 locomotives. Their numbers and renumbering details are listed in the table.

Liveries
The whole series was delivered in the SAR Gulf Red livery with signal red cowcatchers, yellow whiskers and with the number plates on the sides mounted on three-stripe yellow wings. In the 1990s many of the Series 4 units began to be repainted in the Spoornet orange livery with a yellow and blue chevron pattern on the cowcatchers. Several later received the Spoornet maroon livery. In the late 1990s at least two were repainted in the Spoornet blue livery with solid numbers. After 2008 in the Passenger Rail Agency of South Africa (PRASA) era, at least one was repainted in the PRASA purple livery.

Illustration

References

External links

Bo-Bo locomotives
Cape gauge railway locomotives
2900
Railway locomotives introduced in 1973
Union Carriage & Wagon locomotives